And Why Not? were a British pop trio, from Birmingham, West Midlands, England. Their only album, Move Your Skin (1990) was produced by Alan Shacklock, formerly a guitarist in the rock band Babe Ruth, and engineered by Bryan Smith and Harry Sutcliffe, recorded at Mediasmiths Studio, London, Colney.

Career
And Why Not?'s lead vocalist, Wayne Gidden, was supported with backing vocals from Michael Steer (also on drums, percussion) and  Hylton Horatio Hayles (also bass guitar). A fourth member, Peter Morrison, left in the group's early days to pursue other interests.

The group had three top-40 singles on the UK Singles Chart during 1989 and 1990. They played as supporting act to UB40 at the National Exhibition Centre in Birmingham in 1990, and they supported Transvision Vamp at the Hammersmith Odeon in the same year.

Discography

Studio albums

Singles

References

British musical trios
English boy bands
Musical groups from Birmingham, West Midlands
Musical groups established in 1989